Hero and Heroine is the seventh studio album by English band Strawbs.

Background

After the tour supporting the previous album, Bursting at the Seams (1973), there was an acrimonious  split leaving only Dave Cousins and Dave Lambert to rebuild the band. John Hawken of The Nashville Teens and Renaissance on keyboards, Chas Cronk on bass and Rod Coombes on drums from Juicy Lucy and Stealers Wheel completed the line-up.  The new line-up gelled very quickly and studio sessions were very productive. The album was released first in the US to a warm reception, and then in the UK where reviews were less positive. The album only reached number 35 on the UK Album Charts and the band increasingly began to look to North America for a successful future.

All band members made writing contributions, notably Chas Cronk, with whom Cousins would write many songs on future albums.

Critical reception

Stephen Lambe, author of Citizens of Hope and Glory: The Story of Progressive Rock, has called it "their most prog album" and has identified John Hawken's Mellotron playing as "a particular highlight". The album ranked number 44 in 50 Greatest Prog Rock Albums of All Time list of Rolling Stone magazine.

Track listing

The following tracks did not feature on the original vinyl release, but were included as bonus tracks on the A&M reissue.

Personnel
Dave Cousins – lead vocals, backing vocals, acoustic guitar, electric guitar
Dave Lambert – lead vocals, backing vocals, acoustic guitar, electric guitar
John Hawken – organ, piano, electric piano, Mellotron, synthesizer
Chas Cronk – backing vocals, bass guitar, synthesizer
Rod Coombes – backing vocals, drums, percussion

Additional personnel
Claire Deniz – cello on "Midnight Sun"

Recording

Dave Cousins, Tom Allom – Producers
Tom Allom, Freddy Hansson – Engineers

Recorded at Rosenberg Studios, Copenhagen.

Release history

Sources
Hero and Heroine at strawbsweb.co.uk
Hero and Heroine: CD 540 935-2 - sleeve notes

Notes

Strawbs albums
1974 albums
Albums produced by Tom Allom
A&M Records albums